Rhinella gnustae is a species of toad in the family Bufonidae that is endemic to Argentina. Its natural habitat is rivers.
It is threatened by habitat loss.

References

Sources

gnustae
Amphibians of Argentina
Amphibians of the Andes
Amphibians described in 1967
Endemic fauna of Argentina
Taxonomy articles created by Polbot